Mormons for ERA was a feminist organization that lobbied on behalf of the Equal Rights Amendment (ERA) in the 1970s and 1980s. The group was led by Sonia Johnson.

History of the organization 
The Church of Jesus Christ of Latter-day Saints (LDS Church) opposed the ERA, starting in 1976. After the church came out in opposition of the amendment, a group of women members of the LDS Church founded Mormons for ERA in the late 1970s. Marilyn Warenski's book Patriarchs and Politics has been created with building enthusiasm for this feminist group.

Mormons for ERA was based in Sterling, Virginia under the leadership of Sonia Johnson. Johnson was excommunicated from the LDS Church in 1979 by her bishop, Jeffrey Willis, for her support for the ERA. She served as the first president of this organization when she was elected in 1980. Three other women co-founded the group, including Teddie Wood, a fifth generation church member. Other leaders of the organization included Hazel Davis Rigby and Maida Withers.

According to Johnson, by 1979 Mormons for ERA had over 500 members. The group was especially active between 1977 and 1983. By 1983, it was estimated there were 1,200 members in the organization.

State chapters

California 
In 1980, Audrey McIlwrath served as the coordinator for the group's Southern California chapter. She printed a booklet known as the "Gray Book" outlining the beliefs of the organization after many other printers refused to help with distribution.

Washington 
The state of Washington had an active chapter of Mormons for ERA, with Mary La Brosse as the state coordinator.

Timeline of political activity

1980 
In 1980, Johnson chained herself to the church's Seattle Washington Temple to raise awareness for the need for the ERA.

1982 
In 1982, a group of women, including Johnson, protested for the ERA when they chained themselves to the Washington D.C. Temple. This action was coordinated with the group Congressional Union in recognition of the group that fought for suffrage during the progressive era.

List of members 

 Sonia Johnson
 Mary La Brosse
 Audrey McIlwrath
 Hazel Davis Rigby
 Lee Ann Walker
 Shirley Wallace
 Maida Rust Withers
 Arlene Wood
 Teddie Wood

Later years 
As of 2022, Mormons for ERA is still politically active and organizes its members through its Facebook group.

See also 

 A Group of Women
 Grassroots Group of Second Class Citizens
 Zoe Nicholson

References

Further reading

Feminist organizations in the United States
The Church of Jesus Christ of Latter-day Saints
Organizations established in 1977
Organizations based in Virginia
Women's rights organizations
Equal Rights Amendment organizations